Lost in a Garden of Clouds is a series of albums by Alpha. Part 1 was released in 2004 and Part 2 was released in 2006. Each album is a continuous mix of instrumental work from Alpha. Alpha's official website described it as "an endless journey from reality, pure art-house, a mix of song, spoken word and recurring themes."

Track listing

References

External links
 
 

Album series
Alpha (band) albums